Michelle Quilty is a camogie player. She played in the 2009 All-Ireland Senior Camogie Championship Final and was a member of the Team of the Championship for 2011. With a total of 5-26 she was the fourth highest scoring player in the Championship in 2011.

Career & Honours
She was an Ashbourne Cup and league medal-winner with Waterford IT in 2009. Michelle's brother, Martin, is Chairman of the Co. Camogie Board. She won two Under-16 and two Minor All-Irelands, along with a National League in 2008 and Leinster honours in Under-16 (two), Minor (three) and Senior (two).

References

External links 
 Official Camogie Website
 Kilkenny Camogie Website
 of 2009 championship in On The Ball Official Camogie Magazine
 https://web.archive.org/web/20091228032101/http://www.rte.ie/sport/gaa/championship/gaa_fixtures_camogie_oduffycup.html Fixtures and results] for the 2009 O'Duffy Cup
 All-Ireland Senior Camogie Championship: Roll of Honour
 Video highlights of 2009 championship Part One and part two
 Video Highlights of 2009 All Ireland Senior Final
 Report of All Ireland final in Irish Times Independent and Examiner

1990 births
Living people
Kilkenny camogie players
Waterford IT camogie players